Dolphin is a free and open source file manager included in the KDE Applications bundle. Dolphin became the default file manager of the KDE Plasma desktop environments in the fourth iteration, termed KDE Software Compilation 4. It can also be optionally installed on K Desktop Environment 3. It replaces Konqueror as the default file manager for KDE SC 4, but Konqueror can still be used as an alternative file manager.

Under previous K Desktop Environment versions, Konqueror had served both as the default file manager and web browser. However, for many years users have been critical of Konqueror as being too complex for simple file navigation. As a response, the two functions were divided into two separate applications. Under KDE SC 4, Dolphin was streamlined for browsing files, while sharing as much code as possible with Konqueror. Konqueror continues to be developed primarily as a web browser.

In 2014, work started on porting Dolphin to KDE Frameworks 5. This is now complete and a Frameworks 5-based version was released as part of KDE Applications 15.08 in August 2015.

Dolphin and K Desktop Environment 3 
As development of the KDE SC 4 version was underway, the K Desktop Environment 3 version of Dolphin was discontinued. However, the program continues to be unofficially available for K Desktop Environment 3 under the slightly modified name of “D3lphin”. D3lphin contains many bugfixes and a new sidebar and is maintained by the TDE project.

Features 
 Breadcrumb navigation bar – each part of the URL is clickable
 3 view modes (Icons, Details and Compact), remembered for each folder (configurable)
 File Previews
 Split views (for copying and moving files)
 Network transparency – using KDE’s KIO slaves
 Undo/Redo functionality
 Tabbed navigation
 Renaming of a variable number of selected items in one step
 Baloo (file indexer) integration, which includes
 File search
 Tagging, rating and commenting files
 Places bar which also integrates with the Kickoff launcher menu's “Computer” tab
 Sorting and grouping of files by name, size, type and others

Networking  
 SAMBA integration – allowing configuration of SMB server

Gallery

See also 

 Comparison of file managers
 GNOME Files - GNOME counterpart
 Total Commander - Windows 3rd party file manager

References

External links 
 
 The Dolphin Handbook
 Dolphin user wiki
 Binary downloads for Windows and Mac (scroll down to Dolphin)

Applications using D-Bus
Free file managers
KDE Applications
File managers